West End High School is a historic building in Nashville, Tennessee, USA.

History
The building was completed in 1937. It was built as a project of the Public Works Administration. The building's name was changed to West End Middle School in 1971. In 2015, it hosted grades 5-8.

Architectural significance
The building was designed by architect Donald W. Southgate in the Colonial Revival architectural style. It has been listed on the National Register of Historic Places since August 1, 2003.

Notable students
William P. Lawrence (1947), United States Navy vice admiral and Naval Aviator; a prisoner of war in Vietnam.

References

Schools in Nashville, Tennessee
School buildings completed in 1937
Colonial Revival architecture in Tennessee
School buildings on the National Register of Historic Places in Tennessee
National Register of Historic Places in Nashville, Tennessee